SS Rosehill, also known as SS Penhill, was a  steel-hulled collier built in 1911 by S.P. Austin and Son of Sunderland under the name Minster. She was torpedoed by the Imperial German Navy submarine UB-40 in the English Channel off Fowey, Cornwall, England, on 23 September 1917 while en route from Cardiff, Wales, to Devonport. She was taken under tow but sank in Whitsand Bay at 18:05.

This wreck, which has been adopted by Totnes SAC under the "adopt-a-wreck" scheme, is often overlooked by divers, as the wrecks of the  Liberty ship  and Royal Navy frigate  are close by and in shallower water.  The wreck is considerably broken up, and is hard to find on an echo sounder.

External links
Totnes SAC

Colliers
Wreck diving sites in the United Kingdom
World War I shipwrecks in the English Channel
Maritime incidents in 1917
Ships sunk by German submarines in World War I
Ships built on the River Wear
1911 ships